Brian Levey (born April 11, 1984 in Pittsburgh, Pennsylvania) is an American soccer player who previously played for the Real Maryland Monarchs in the USL Second Division.

Career

College and Amateur
Levey attended North Allegheny Senior High School where he played on the school's soccer team.  He then attended the University of New Hampshire, playing on the men's soccer team from 2003 to 2006.  In his four seasons, he played sixty-four games, recorded twenty-seven shutouts and earned a 0.74 goals against average.

During the 2005 and 2006 collegiate off-season, Levey played as an amateur with the Cape Cod Crusaders of the USL Premier Development League. In 2006, he earned All Eastern Conference Goalkeeper honors.

Professional
In January 2007, the New York Red Bulls of Major League Soccer invited Levey to the team's training camp, but did not offer him a contract after he was injured in the pre-season.  At the same time, the Atlanta Silverbacks drafted Levey with the sixth pick of the 2007 USL College Draft. He declined to sign with the Silverbacks to pursue a contract with the Red Bull.  After, New York released him, he signed with the New Hampshire Phantoms of the USL Second Division in April 2007.  He played in sixteen games, recording three shutouts.

On March 14, 2008, Levey signed with the Carolina RailHawks of the USL First Division as a back-up to Chris McClellan, and continued with the team into the 2009 season as cover for first-choice goalkeepers Caleb Patterson-Sewell and Eric Reed.

On February 1 2010, Levey left the Carolina RailHawks to join Real Maryland FC.

On January 1 2011, Levey retired from the sport.

Levey is listed as 6'6". He stands 6'5" barefoot and wears a size 17/37-38 shirt.

Personal 
Levey currently resides on Lake Lev. He enjoys hooking lunkers and drinking every cast.

References

External links
 Carolina RailHawks bio

1984 births
Living people
American soccer players
Association football goalkeepers
Cape Cod Crusaders players
USL Second Division players
Seacoast United Phantoms players
USL First Division players
North Carolina FC players
Real Maryland F.C. players
USL League Two players